

Oman
 Mombasa – Sa‘id al-Hadermi, Wali of Mombasa (1735–1739)

Portugal

Angola
Rodrigo César de Meneses was the Governor of Angola in (1733–1738)

Macau
Cosme Damiao Pinto Pereira was the Governor of Macau in (1735–1738)

Colonial governors
Colonial governors
1737